Saint-Gervais-la-Forêt, commonly known as Saint-Gervais, is a commune in the French department of Loir-et-Cher, administrative region of Centre-Val de Loire.

Population

See also
Communes of the Loir-et-Cher department

References

Communes of Loir-et-Cher